Marcel Samuel Raphaël Cohen (February 6, 1884 – November 5, 1974) was a French linguist. He was an important scholar of Semitic languages and especially of Ethiopian languages. He studied the French language and contributed much to general linguistics.

Life 

Marcel Cohen was born in Paris. He studied at the Lycée Condorcet. He attended Antoine Meillet's lectures at the Collège de France and the École pratique des hautes études. In 1905 he registered at the École des langues orientales and graduated in 1909. He Studied Amharic (under Mondon-Vidailhet), French linguistics, Sanskrit, Ge'ez and South Arabian. He wrote his thesis on the Arabic dialect of the Jews of Algiers (Le parler arabe des juifs d'Alger). 
Between March 1910 and June 1911, he undertook a journey to Ethiopia in which he collected much material on Ethiopian languages.
He succeeded Mondon-Vidailhet, who had just died, as chargé de cours d'Abyssin at the École des langues orientales.
In 1916 he became Assistant Professor and in 1926 a full Professor. In 1919 he also became professor of Ethiopic at the École pratique des hautes études.
He had several students who became distinguished éthiopisants, such as: Wolf Leslau, Stefan Strelcyn and Joseph Tubiana.

Works 

 1912: Le parler arabe des Juifs d'Alger. Paris: Champion.
 1912: Rapport sur une mission linguistique en Abyssinie (1910-1911). Paris: Imprimerie Nationale.
 1920: Documents ethnographiques d'Abyssinie. Paris: Leroux.
 1921: "La prononciation traditionelle du Guèze (éthiopien classique)", in: Journal asiatique Sér. 11 / T. 18 (electronic version in Gallica digital library of the Bibliothèque nationale de France PDF).
 1924: Couplets amhariques du Choa. Paris: Imprimerie Nationale.
 1924: Le système verbal sémitique et l'expression du temps. Paris: Leroux.
 1924: (with Antoine Meillet) Les langues du monde. Paris: Champion. (2nd ed. 1952)
 1931: Etudes d'éthiopien méridional. Paris: Geuthner.
 1934: Documents sudarabiques. Paris: dépôt chez Adrien Maisonneuve.
 1936: Traité de langue amharique. Paris: Institut d'Ethnographie. (reprinted: 1970, 1995 )
 1939: Nouvelles études d'éthiopien meridional. Paris: Champion.
 1947: Essai comparatif sur le vocabulaire et la phonétique chamito-sémitique. Paris: Champion.
 1947: Histoire d'une langue: le français. Paris: Editions Réunis. (4th ed., Editions Sociales 1974)
 1950: Regards sur la langue française. Paris: Editions Sociales.
 1950: Le langage: structure et évolution. Paris: Editions Sociales.
 1954: Grammaire et style.
 1958: La grande invention de l'écriture et son évolution. Paris: Klincksieck.
 1962: Etudes sur le langage de l'enfant. Paris: Editions du Scarabée.
 1963: Nouveaux regards sur la langue française.
 1963: Encore des regards sur la langue française.
 1970: Toujours des regards sur la langue française.
 1972: Une fois de plus des regards sur la langue française. Paris: Editions Sociales.

See also 
 Wolf Leslau

References 

 Bert, Jean-François (2015). « Sociologie et linguistique. Penser la relation entre langue et société », in Christine Laurière (dir.), 1913. La recomposition de la science de l’Homme, Les Carnets de Bérose n°7, Paris, BEROSE - International Encyclopaedia of the Histories of Anthropology, pp. 167–176.
Cohen, David (ed.) (1970). Mélanges Marcel Cohen: études de linguistique, ethnographie et sciences connexes offertes par ses amis et ses élèves à l'occasion de son 80ème anniversaire; avec des articles et études inédits de Marcel Cohen. The Hague: Mouton.
 Imprimerie Nationale (1955; ed.), Cinquante années de recherches linguistiques, ethnographiques, sociologiques, critiques et pédagogiques. Paris.
 Lentin, Irène (December 1984). "Marcel Cohen", in: Bulletin de l'Association des anciens élèves, pp. 64–68.
 Rouaud, Alain (1995), "Marcel Cohen", in: Pierre Labrousses, Deux siècles d'histoire de l'École des Langues orientales (Paris), pp. 363–367.
 Rouaud, Alain (2003), "Cohen, Marcel", in: S. Uhlig et al. (eds.), Encyclopaedia Aethiopica Vol. 1: A-C (Wiesbadn: Harrassowitz), pp. 766a-766b.
Strelcyn, S. (1975). "Obituary: Marcel Cohen", in: Bulletin of the School of Oriental and African Studies 38/3, pp. 615–622.
 Union Française Universitaire (1985; ed.), Hommage à Marcel Cohen. Paris.

References

External links 

 Resources related to research : BEROSE - International Encyclopaedia of the Histories of Anthropology. "Cohen, Marcel (1884-1974)", Paris, 2015. (ISSN 2648-2770) 

1884 births
Scientists from Paris
1974 deaths
Linguists from France
Lycée Condorcet alumni
Academic staff of the École pratique des hautes études
Semiticists
Ethiopianists
Prix Roger Caillois recipients
Members of the German Academy of Sciences at Berlin
20th-century linguists